Nathaniel Gould (21 December 1857 – 25 July 1919), commonly known as Nat Gould, was a British novelist.

History
Gould was born at Manchester, Lancashire, the only surviving child of Nathaniel Gould, a tea merchant, and his wife Mary, née Wright. Both parents came from Derbyshire yeomen families. The boy was indulgently brought up and well educated. His father died just before he was to have left school, and Gould tried first his father's tea trade and then farming at Bradbourne with his uncles. Gould became a good horseman but a poor farmer. In 1877, in reply to an advertisement, he was given a position on the Newark Advertiser gaining a good all-round knowledge of press work. After a few years he became restless, and in 1884 sailed for Australia, where he became a reporter on the Brisbane Telegraph in its shipping, commercial and racing departments. In 1887 after disagreements with the Telegraph management, Gould went to Sydney and worked on the Referee as "Verax", its horse-racing editor. Later Gould worked for the Sunday Times, and Evening News. Then followed 18 months at Bathurst as the editor of the Bathurst Times during which time he wrote his first novel, With the Tide, which appeared as a serial in the Referee. He returned to Sydney and the Referee and wrote another six other novels for the same paper. In 1891 his first novel, With the Tide, was published in book form in England under the title of The Double Event and was an immediate success; it sold over 100,000 copies in its first ten years and was still in print in 1919. It was dramatized in Australia and had a long run in 1893. In 1895 Gould returned to England; he had been 11 years in Australia and he felt that his experiences had made a man of him.

Back in England, Gould returned to writing fiction, for many years writing an average of over four novels a year; about 130 are listed in Miller's Australian Literature. Gould also published in 1895 On and Off the Turf in Australia, in 1896 Town and Bush, Stray Notes on Australia; in 1900 Sporting Sketches; and in 1909 The Magic of Sport: mainly autobiographical. His novels attracted enormous public interest and his sales ran into many millions of copies. He travelled, retained his interest in racing to the end, and died on 25 July 1919. Nat Gould was buried at Bradbourne in Derbyshire on 29 July 1919, and his grave is marked by a stone cross near the churchyard gates.

In April 1886 in Brisbane, he married Miss Elizabeth Madelaine Ruska, and there were seven children of the marriage.

Gould was a modest man who did not take himself or his work too seriously. His advice to emerging writers was to 'write about men and things you have met and seen; take your characters from the busy world, and your scenes from Nature'. But within its limits his work was very good. He told a simple story exceedingly well in an unaffected way. Many of his books were concerned with horse racing, and no great originality of plot was to be expected, but they were written with such flair and genuine interest that their countless readers took up each book as it was published, confident in their belief that here was another rattling good story.

References

B. G. Andrews, 'Gould, Nathaniel (Nat) (1857–1919)', Australian Dictionary of Biography, Volume 9, Melbourne University Press, 1983, p. 61. Retrieved 25 December 2008

External links
 Nat Gould at Nat Gould: His Life and Books
 
 
 

1857 births
1919 deaths
19th-century Australian novelists
19th-century English novelists
20th-century Australian novelists
20th-century English novelists
Australian journalists
Australian male novelists
English male journalists
Writers from Manchester
English male novelists
19th-century English male writers
20th-century Australian male writers
Sport Australia Hall of Fame inductees